The men's 4 × 100 metre medley relay competition of the swimming events at the 2011 World Aquatics Championships took place July 31. The heats and final took place July 31.

Records
Prior to the competition, the existing world and championship records were as follows.

Results

Heats
17 teams participated in 3 heats.

Final
The final was held at 19:38.

References

External links
2011 World Aquatics Championships: Men's 4×100 metre medley relay entry list , from OmegaTiming.com; retrieved 2011-07-23.
FINA World Championships, Swimming: United States Edges Australia for 400 Medley Relay Win, Swimming World Magazine (2011-07-31); retrieved 2011-08-09.

Medley relay 4 x 100 metre, men's
World Aquatics Championships